Amanita virgineoides, known as the false virgin's lepidella, is a species of fungus in the genus Amanita.

Description 
The basidiocarps are medium-sized to large. The pileus of the cap is 70 - 150 (7 – 15 cm) mm wide, is convex to applanate, sometimes concave, white, covered with white, conical to pyramid volval remnants 1 – 3 mm high and wide; the cap margin is smooth and appendiculate; and the context is white and unchanging.

The gills are free to subfree and white to cream; the short gills are attenuate.
	
The stipe is 100 - 200 (10 – 20 cm) × 15 – 30 mm (1.5 – 3 cm), subcylindric or slightly attenuate upwards, white, covered with white floccose squamules; the context is white; the stipe's basal bulb is 30 – 40 mm wide, ventricose, ovoid to subglobose, with its upper part covered with white, verrucose to granular volval remnants.  The annulus is white; its upper surface bears fine, radial striations; and its lower surface, verrucose to conical warts.  The annulus is often broken during expansion of the cap.

The spores measure 8.0 - 10.0 (0.8 – 1 mm) ×  6.0 - 7.5 (0.6 - 0.75 mm) µm and are broadly ellipsoid to ellipsoid and amyloid.  Clamps are common at bases of basidia.

See also 
List of Amanita species
Amanita

References 

virgineoides